The list of University of Texas at San Antonio (UTSA) people includes notable alumni, faculty, and affiliates of UTSA. The term UTSA is used more commonly than University of Texas at San Antonio and the term Roadrunners is commonly used to refer to students and alumni of UTSA.

UTSA alumni

Academia, science, and technology

Athletics

Arts and literature

Business and law

Film, journalism, television, and theatre

Military

Music

Politics

UTSA faculty and affiliates

References

External links 
University of Texas at San Antonio Alumni Association

University of Texas at San Antonio people
University of Texas at San Antonio people